The Individual large hill competition at the FIS Nordic World Ski Championships 2019 was held on 22 and 23 February 2019. A qualification was held on 22 February.

Results

Qualification
The qualification was held on 22 February 2019 at 14:30.

Final
The first round was started on 23 February at 14:30 and the final round at 15:44.

References

Individual large hill